The University of Minnesota Marching Band (also known as UMMB, Minnesota Marching Band, and The Pride of Minnesota) is the marching band of the University of Minnesota and the flagship university band for the state of Minnesota. The Pride of Minnesota serves as an ambassador for the university, representing the school at major events both on and off campus.  The band performs before, during, and after all home Golden Gopher football games and bowl games, occasional away games, local parades, numerous pepfests, exhibition performances, as well as a series of indoor concerts at the end of the regular football season.  Members of the band, along with non-member students, also participate in smaller athletic pep bands that perform at other major sporting events, including men's hockey, men's basketball, women's hockey, women's basketball, and women's volleyball.

History
The University of Minnesota Marching Band was formed with 29 members as the University Cadet Band in 1892, functioning as part of the university cadet corps and stationed in the University of Minnesota Armory after its construction in 1896.  The band performed its first halftime field show during the 1910 football season at Northrop Field.  Among the formations included was the "Block M" that now serves as the University's logo.  The "Block M" formation remains present in the band's pregame show.

Near the end of World War I in 1918, the University Cadet Band was merged with the local Army band in order to form First Regiment of Minnesota Band, in addition to a second, more briefly existing Second Regiment of Minnesota Band.  However, both bands were decommissioned along with the Regiment at the conclusion of the war.  Following the war, university students who were members of the band were offered a position in a separate University Band, with the word "cadet" having been dropped from its name.
  

After the 1923 football season, Memorial Stadium was constructed, and the band began to perform on the field, which was the home of football games and marching band shows for 57 years, the longest of any of the university's stadiums.  The band "brought spectacle and song to game days," and halftime shows included moving renditions of rivalry trophies such as Floyd of Rosedale and the Little Brown Jug, as well as greetings to university figures such as football coach Bernie Bierman.

In January 1965, the Minnesota Marching Band was featured in the Inaugural Parade in Washington, DC for the second inauguration of U.S. President Lyndon B. Johnson.

In 1982, the band's performances moved once again after the opening of the Hubert H. Humphrey Metrodome and the subsequent relocation of Golden Gopher football from Memorial Stadium.

The Minnesota Marching Band performed during the halftime show of Super Bowl XXVI on January 26, 1992, along with former Olympic champions Brian Boitano and Dorothy Hamill, and singer Gloria Estefan.

In the fall of 2009, with the opening of TCF Bank Stadium (now Huntington Bank Stadium) on the university's campus, the band's game-day performances moved back to campus and to an outdoor field for the first time since leaving Memorial Stadium in 1981.

On February 4, 2018, the Minnesota Marching Band performed alongside Justin Timberlake in the halftime show of Super Bowl LII.  The band was featured in Timberlake’s R&B hit “Suit & Tie”, and performed additional choreography and drill during “Mirrors" and the show’s finale, "Can't Stop the Feeling!".

Members of the band and the University of Minnesota Dance Team performed with the Jonas Brothers in concert at the Minneapolis Armory during the NCAA Division I Men's Basketball Final Four on April 6, 2019.  The band joined the pop-rock group onstage for the finale of their newly-released single "Cool". 

In March of 2022, 30 members of the Minnesota Marching Band traveled to Dubai in the United Arab Emirates for the World Expo 2020. The purpose of the trip was to perform as representatives on behalf of the University and the United States to generate excitement for Minnesota's bid to host Expo 2027 in Bloomington, MN. On the trip, the band played at numerous events, including a parade around the Expo for USA National Day, in front of the USA Pavilion, as well as for the United States ceremony. High-level audience members included Secretary of Commerce, Gina Raimondo, as well as other dignitaries of the U.S. and UAE. The group also reached citizens from over 190 countries across the world.

In May of 2022, members of the band played the Minnesota Rouser and Battle Hymn of the Republic at a memorial for Former Vice President Walter Mondale at Northrop Auditorium. The Mondale family requested the band be there, as the former Vice President was a Gopher alum and strong supporter of the University. At the memorial, the band performed following speeches from supporters of the program, including Governor Tim Walz, and Senators Amy Klobuchar and Tina Smith. In addition to the hundreds of high-level attendees, the band joined President Joe Biden in wrapping up the memorial service.

Women in the Band
When it was originally formed, the band consisted of exclusively males.  Women were first allowed to perform with the band in 1943-1945, when they were allowed to "fill in" for male members of the band that were serving in World War II. In 1950, a "Women's division" of the band was created, which lasted for several years.  Women were allowed to be full members of the band in 1972 following the passage of Title IX. Molly Watters was selected in 2006 as the first female Drum Major in the history of the band. Julia White was selected to be the second female drum major in 2021. In July 2016, Betsy McCann was named the director of the band, becoming the first female director in the history of the band, and of all marching bands in the Big Ten Conference.

Marching Style

The University of Minnesota Marching Band primarily uses both the chair step and glide step for performances, similar to other bands of the Big Ten Conference.  The band's pregame show is performed almost entirely with chair step, which consists of bringing the leg up so that the thigh is parallel to the ground, the shin is completely vertical, and toes are pointed at the ground. Halftime shows are performed using corps-style glide step that allows for more musicality and forms that do not necessarily conform to a grid. "Run-Cadence" is the band's method of getting on and off the field for shows. It consists of a double-time chair step, although the quicker pace of it necessitates that at times neither foot is in contact with the ground, as is the case with the regular chair step.

Facilities 
Throughout much of its history, the University of Minnesota Marching Band's facilities were located in the University of Minnesota's Northrop Auditorium, where it shared space with several other campus organizations.  However, in 2009, the band moved to specialized rehearsal facilities within the newly constructed TCF Bank Stadium. Following the 2021 merger of TCF Bank and Michigan-based Huntington Bank, the stadium rebranded to Huntington Bank Stadium, where the band now has daily access. Located on the northern side of Huntington Bank Stadium, the 20,000 square foot band facilities include a rotunda entrance, a rehearsal hall, ensemble practice rooms, a music and drill library, recording technology, archives, instrument and equipment storage, uniform storage, locker rooms, and showers.  The facilities also serve as the band’s administrative offices, conference space, and study space for members, as well as a location to display photos, artifacts, and other elements of the band's history. During performances at football games, the marching band is located in a partitioned section of the stadium seating at the base of the student section and level with the eastern end of the stadium field.  This section of the stadium, known as the "Pride Pit", is framed by a backdrop labeled Pride of Minnesota and is connected directly to the indoor facilities via the stadium tunnels and indoor hallways.

Organization

Director 
The University of Minnesota Marching Band has had 19 directors, some of whom held the position at multiple points throughout the band's history.  The director of the band at its inception was Neville Staughton, at the time the director of the Winona community band and a Lieutenant in the Cadet Corps.  However, Gerald R. Prescott, who was granted a professorship at the university music department in 1932, was the first full-time faculty director of the marching band. The sixth director, Michael Jalma, is credited with writing the lyrics to accompany John Philip Sousa's Minnesota March, one of the university's popular school songs. One of the most influential directors in the history of the band is Dr. Frank Bencriscutto, who was responsible for initiating many of the band's current traditions, such as the annual indoor concerts, as well as arranging many of the works currently used by the marching band, including the current arrangement of the Minnesota Rouser.

The current director of the University of Minnesota Marching Band is Professor Betsy McCann, who graduated from the University of Minnesota and holds a graduate degree from Northwestern University.  She was named director of the band in 2016 after the previous director, Timothy Diem, stepped down following sixteen years with the band.  McCann, having formerly acted as the Assistant Director of the marching band, currently serves as both the Director of Marching and Athletic Bands as well as the Assistant Director of Bands at the University of Minnesota.  A previous director of the marching band, Jerry Luckhardt, who had previously served as the director of the Michigan Marching Band, now acts as the Associate Director of Bands at the University of Minnesota, and remains as an important faculty member in the marching band.

Following are those who have held the position of director of the band:
 Betsy McCann (2016–Present)
 Timothy Diem (2005–2016)
 Jerry Luckhardt (1997–2004)
 Eric A Becher (1991–1996)
 Barry E. Kopetz (1986–1990)
 O'Neill Sanford (1976–1985)
 Frank Bencriscutto (1960-1976, 1985 - 1986)
 Gale Sperry (1957-1960)
 Ernest Villas (1950-1951)
 Merton Utgaard (1945-1946)
 Daniel Martino (1943-1945)
 Gerald R. Prescott (1932-1943, 1946-1950, 1951-1957)
 William A. Abbott (1931-1932)
 Michael Jalma (1920-1931)
 Karl Scheurer (1919-1920)
 J. Arthur Lampe (1918-1919)
 B. A. Rose (1898-1918)
 Charles W. Graves (1894-1898)
 Neville Staughton (1892-1894)

Assistant Director 
The current Assistant Director of the University of Minnesota Marching Band is Dr. John Leonard, who graduated from the University of Massachusetts-Amherst with a Bachelor of Music degree in instrumental music education and holds graduate degrees from the University of Massachusetts-Amherst, Western Michigan University, and University of Kansas. Dr. Leonard formerly acted as the Interim Assistant Director of Bands and Director of the Bronco Marching Band at Western Michigan University.

Drum Major 
The University of Minnesota Marching Band has a single drum major. The current drum major of the marching band is Jon Ingram. In its history, the University of Minnesota Marching Band has had 66 drum majors, some holding the position as long as five seasons.  The drum major is considered the leading member of the ensemble, and acts as an instructor, spokesperson, and performer.  The responsibilities of the drum major include marching and mace-spinning performances on the field during shows, conducting the band in the stands during games, leading parades, and acting as a leader and teacher during rehearsals.  Similarly to the position in other marching bands in the Big Ten Conference, the drum major is known for the execution of the traditional "back bend" during the pregame show, where they bend backwards until their head touches the ground.

Block Captain 
The marching band has one block captain, who is considered a partner to the drum major in leading the band, and serves as a backup performer to the drum major.  Like the drum major, the position is of a leadership and instructional nature. The current block captain of the University of Minnesota Marching Band is Kindra Peterson.

Feature Twirler 
Like other Big Ten marching bands, the University of Minnesota has a section of baton twirlers. The twirlers of the Minnesota Marching Band consist of three Feature Twirlers. The position of Feature Twirler is competitive, and therefore involves a rigorous audition process.  The twirlers are responsible for marching both on the field during pregame and halftime shows, and in parades.  The Feature Twirlers, perform dynamic baton routines that involve a variety of turns and catches, toss illusions, baton work, and occasional use of fire batons. The current Feature Twirlers for the University of Minnesota are Katelyn Rand, Paige Nikodem, and Ashley Sheil.

Instrumentation 
The Pride of Minnesota consists of approximately 320 members, and has a complete marching band instrumentation consisting of flutes, piccolos, clarinets, alto saxophones, tenor saxophones, trumpets, mellophones, trombones, baritones, tubas, drumline, and color guard. The drumline, which makes up 30 of the 320 members of the band, consists of 8 snare drums, 6 multi-tenor drums, 6 bass drums, and 10 cymbals. Beyond its traditional instrumentation, the University of Minnesota Marching Band also has a section of Big Ten flags, which represent the conference and its 14 member schools, and are featured solely during the pregame show. Each instrumental and auxiliary section has a group of student leaders who combined make up the student leadership team of the band.

Training

Spat Camp 
Training for the University of Minnesota Marching Band begins annually with "Spat Camp," a ten-day training, conditioning, and preparation period in late August where both new and returning members learn, relearn, and practice marching fundamentals, music, and drill.  During Spat Camp, marching band members stay in university residence halls, rehearse at Huntington Bank Stadium, and participate in the first round of assessments for the pregame block.  The student leadership team arrives first each season for a three-day leadership training period, followed by new members, who arrive two days prior to returning members in order to learn basic fundamentals.  Each day of the ten-day period lasts up to 13 hours, and consists of music rehearsals, marching practice, choreography, and instrument sectionals.  The period ends with the band's performance at the Minnesota State Fair Parade on the Sunday before Labor Day.  The name "Spat Camp" was derived from the nature of the training period as a musical equivalent to a military boot camp, however instead referring to the spats worn by marchers instead of boots.

Rehearsals 
During the regular fall semester academic season, the marching band holds two-hour rehearsals on Monday through Thursday evenings at Huntington Bank Stadium.  On weekends of home football games, the band also rehearses on Friday evenings and Saturday mornings.  The rehearsal schedule of the band is designed to avoid conflict with most university classes.  The three athletic pep bands associated with the marching band hold rehearsals once per week in the late evenings after the regular marching band rehearsal.

Traditions

Indoor Concerts 
In 1961, marching band director Dr. Frank Bencriscutto decided that, in addition to performing at football games, the band should also put on an indoor concert at which the band would be the sole performers, instead of taking a role secondary to that of the football team. This was the first concert of its kind; many other collegiate marching bands have adopted this practice since. The Indoor Concerts, which now consist of two concerts each year during late November, have been almost continuously performed at the University of Minnesota's Northrop Auditorium since their creation.  However, in 2011, the auditorium closed to begin a three-year renovation, causing the marching band to perform three of its annual concerts in varying locations across the state of Minnesota, including concerts in Rochester, Minnesota and Willmar, Minnesota.  The band returned to performing its regular two-concert series at Northrop Auditorium after the renovation was completed in 2014. In addition to the two annual concerts, the band performs a concert every other year at the Mayo Civic Center in Rochester.

Homecoming Parade 
Every year during homecoming, the Minnesota Marching Band performs in a parade along University Avenue, with the current route beginning in Dinkytown and ending at Huntington Bank Stadium.  The parade also features campus organizations, clubs, faculty, the Gopher Spirit Squad, and the University of Minnesota Alumni Marching Band. The parade began as a part of homecoming celebrations in the early 1900s as a way to promote school spirit, though the location of the parade has changed over time, having also traveled down Washington Avenue through the center of campus.  The parade has been cancelled only ten times in the past during both world wars and the Vietnam War.  In 1942, the parade was billed as "the largest parade in the world" at 2 miles long and featuring 170 cars and floats.

Mound of Sound 
In addition to the formations included as part of its pregame show, the Minnesota Marching Band is known for its traditional "Mound of Sound", a halftime drill formation where, as described by the announcer, they "put a really big band in a really small circle." Performed since the early 1990s in the Metrodome, the drill form is executed while playing Glenn Miller's big band hit "In the Mood", and consists of the band forming concentric circles and collapsing them to fit all 320 musicians in a 12-meter wide mound-shaped circular formation in the center of the field.  At the conclusion of the song, the "mound" is expanded outward once again.

"Hail! Minnesota"

At the end of every rehearsal, performance, or other band event, the members, faculty, and staff of the marching band join together to sing an a capella arrangement of the university's alma mater and the state hymn, Hail! Minnesota.  In addition, after every home football game, the football players and coaches gather in front of the band and student section and sing while the band plays the piece.

"Better Dead than Red" 
Until 2021, it was used often by the University of Minnesota Marching Band, as well as Gopher fans across all sporting events, the phrase "better dead than red" refers to the rival Wisconsin Badgers, whose school colors are red and white.  The slogan stems from a similar phrase used in the same manner or inversely during the Cold War conflict between the United States and the Soviet Union, referring to the symbolic red color of the Soviet flag.  The phrase is yelled as part of a drum cadence by the marching band during parades, in the stands of the stadium, as well as during the pregame show, where the band and student section yell the phrase during the dispersal of the Block M. In 2021, this phrase was taken out of the Pride's repertoire out of respect for Native Americans, among other groups.

Pregame Show

The University of Minnesota Marching Band performs one of the longest and most complex pregame shows of any band in the country.  In its entirety, it is roughly 17 minutes long and includes over 75 pages of drill, the majority of which is performed using chair-step style marching.  There are 244 marching spots in the pregame block, out of the 320 total marching spots within the band.  Periodically throughout the season, band members assess for a spot in the pregame block, including the section of Big Ten flags.  The remaining members are responsible for managing the 40 by 25 yard ceremonial American Flag used during the National Anthem. The pregame show in its current configuration consists of the following:

Entry, Run-Cadence, and Fanfare

The band enters the field beginning with the tuba section, drumline, drum major, and twirlers, which march onto the field to a drum cadence while the band chants "er du klar?", the Norwegian phrase for "are you ready?".  After those sections are in position, the announcer introduces both the band and the Golden Gopher Spirit Squads, and the band enters from the stadium tunnels and forms lines via "Run-Cadence," a fast-paced double-time high step cadence. The band proceeds to expand into a block formation while playing "Fanfare '87", as the announcer introduces the director, drum major, and twirlers.

Minnesota March

After the fanfare, the band marches downfield in a block formation while playing John Philip Sousa's Minnesota March, led by the drum major and Big Ten flags and bounded by the color guard on each side.  As the band marches forward, the drum major stops mid-field and executes the traditional back bend.  After centering on the fifty yard line, the band finishes Minnesota March while creating a diamond-shaped formation in the center of the field.

Gopher Spell-Out

Beginning in the diamond-shaped formation and marching into a rectangular block at the center of the field, the band plays either Go Gopher Victory when facing non-conference opponents, or the school song of an opposing Big Ten university. While either chanting during Go Gopher Victory or after playing the opposing team's school song, the band marches to form the word "GOPHERS" spelled out across the field, before returning to the previous midfield block formation.

Swinging Gates

From the previous block formation, the band begins playing The Battle Hymn of the Republic while creating a series of eight parallel lines, or "gates", spread sequentially down the length of the field, facing the student section and the east end of the stadium.  As the song is played, the University's ROTC honor guard, led by the color guard and followed by the drum major, marches down the center of the field toward the student section as the band begins to "swing" open each gate by splitting each line of marchers into four pivoting sections.  As the honor guard proceeds down the field, each of the eight gates closes behind them until the guard and drum major are positioned in front of the student section and the final fanfare of the song is played.  This drill, known as the "Swinging Gates Formation", has been performed during the band's pregame show since 1961.

Forming of the Block M

After the Swinging Gates Formation, the band returns to the rectangular block mid-field and begins the "Cascade Sequence", in which the band performs a complex high-tempo marching routine to a series of drum cadences in order to transition into a compressed "Block M" formation. After the compressed block has been created, the band begins to expand the compressed block both vertically and horizontally while playing "Fanfare '78 - Pageant" until completing the "Block M" formation, which serves as the logo of the university and the centerpiece of the pregame show. While in the "Block M" formation, the band plays the Minnesota Rouser. As the word "Minnesota" is spelled out during the cheer following the song, the band salutes by kneeling and removing their hats, returning to stand as the cheer finishes.

Rotation and Marching of the Block M

Following the playing of the Minnesota Rouser, the Block M is rotated ninety degrees counterclockwise to a drum cadence in order to face the student section, while the announcer re-introduces the director, drum major, and twirlers, and introduces the block captain and staff.  This is the only significant portion of the pregame show where a low-step marching style is used in place of the traditional high-step. After the Block M has been rotated, the band resumes the use of high-step and marches downfield toward the student section while playing Our Minnesota.

Gauntlet, National Anthem, and Exit

At the end of Our Minnesota, the Block M is dispersed as the band transitions to a "gauntlet" formation in order to prepare for the entrance of the Gopher football team. The band plays the Minnesota Rouser for a second time as the football team runs onto the field.  After the team is on the field, the band members who are not part of the pregame block unroll a large ceremonial American Flag on the field as the band, remaining in the gauntlet formation, plays the Star-Spangled Banner.  Following the National Anthem, the band exits the field via the high-step "Run-Cadence".

Halftime Shows 

As is customary of bands in the Big Ten Conference, the University of Minnesota Marching Band performs a different halftime show for every home football game.  Music is memorized for each performance, which combined results in over 30 memorized pieces for halftime shows throughout the season. The majority of the music included in halftime shows is also featured in the marching band's series of Indoor Concerts at the end of each season.

Athletic Pep Bands
Members of the University of Minnesota Marching Band, along with non-member students, may audition and participate in the three associated athletic pep bands for the University of Minnesota: the Maroon Band, Gold Band, and Gopher Band.  The athletic bands are taken by students as a university course for credit, share marching band rehearsal space at Huntington Bank Stadium, and hold rehearsals weekly in the evenings after marching band rehearsal.  The bands each perform at roughly 25 regular season athletic events over the course of each year, along with several post-season events during conference and NCAA tournaments.  Each university pep band is associated primarily with one or more specific Gopher sports teams, and thus play primarily at games for the respective team(s).

Maroon Band
The University of Minnesota Maroon Pep Band is primarily responsible for playing at Gopher men's hockey games at Mariucci Arena, though also playing occasionally at events for other university athletic teams.  The band leads cheers and traditions along with the student section or "Ice Box" at Gopher men's hockey games, and is notable for its tradition of leading a parade-style march or "march-around," followed by a crowd of fans, around the full concourse of Mariucci Arena prior to the start of hockey games, while playing Minnesota March and ending with the Minnesota Rouser.

Gold Band
The University of Minnesota Gold Pep Band is primarily responsible for playing at Gopher men's basketball games at Williams Arena, nicknamed "The Barn," though also playing occasionally at events for other university athletic teams.  The band leads cheers and traditions with the "Barnyard" student section at Gopher men's basketball games.

Gopher Band
The University of Minnesota Gopher Pep Band is primarily responsible for playing at Gopher women's hockey games at Ridder Arena, women's basketball games at Williams Arena, and women's volleyball games at the University of Minnesota Sports Pavilion. Participation in the Gopher Pep Band is a prerequisite for participation in either the Maroon or Gold pep bands.

References

External links
 

Big Ten Conference marching bands
Musical groups established in 1892
1892 establishments in Minnesota